Petrus Cornelis Stol (26 January 1880 – 27 November 1956), known as Peet Stol, was a Dutch footballer who played in the Netherlands' first ever international match on 30 April 1905, scoring an own goal. Stol, who spent his entire career playing with Haarlemsche FC, made a total of two appearances for the national team in 1905.

References

1880 births
1956 deaths
Dutch footballers
Netherlands international footballers
Footballers from Haarlem
HFC Haarlem players
Association football defenders